The Norwegian Union of Building Industry Workers (NBIAF) was a trade union in Norway, organized under the national Norwegian Confederation of Trade Unions.

It was founded in 1923 as the Norwegian Union of Building Workers. It was a merger between the Norwegian Union of Painters, the Wood Workers' Union of Norway, and relevant sections of the Norwegian Union of General Workers. When it was merged with Norwegian Union of Planing Workers (established 1911) in 1949, it changed its name to the Norwegian Union of Building Industry Workers. In 1961 it absorbed Norwegian Union of Stone Industry Workers (established 1896) and in 1976 it absorbed Norwegian Union of Bricklayers.

Chairmen include Elias Volan (1923–1927), Jens Tangen (1935–1940). Ingvald B. Aase served as secretary in 1930 and became chairman in 1933.

In 1988 it was merged with the Garment Workers' Union, the Norwegian Union of Iron and Metalworkers, the Norwegian Union of Paper Industry Workers and the Norwegian Union of Forestry and Land Workers to form the United Federation of Trade Unions. It had about 63,000 members before the merger.

Presidents
1923: Elias Volan
1927: 
1933: Ingvald B. Aase
1935: Jens Tangen
1940:
1949: John Wivegh
1955: Odin Rønbeck
1962: Lage Haugness
1974: Rasmus Solend
1978: Odd Isaksen

References

Defunct trade unions of Norway
Norwegian Confederation of Trade Unions

Trade unions established in 1923
Trade unions disestablished in 1988
Building and construction trade unions